Letto a tre piazze (translation: The King-Sized Bed) is a 1960 Italian Totò comedy film directed by Steno. The film marked the last collaboration between Totò and Lucio Fulci, author of the script and initially chosen as director.

Cast 
Totò: Antonio Di Cosimo 
Peppino De Filippo: Prof. Peppino Castagnano
Nadia Gray: Amalia
Cristina Gajoni: Prassede, the maid
Aroldo Tieri: Lawyer Vacchi
Gabriele Tinti: Nino, lover of Prassede
Angela Luce: Jeannette
Mario Castellani: The Principal
 Nico Pepe: 	The Hotel Manager

Censorship 
When Letto A Tre Piazze was first released in Italy in 1960 the Italian Ministry of Cultural Heritage and Activities agreed upon its release on the following conditions. 1) the sequence that includes a dancer in a nightclub will be deleted. In particular the sequence in which a dancer, seen in the background behind the heads of Tieri and De Filipo, is doing the belly dance. The afore mentioned scene is considered to be offensive to morality. The scene was shortened by 19 meters, it is currently 22 meters total. Document N° 32482 signed on 28 September 1960  by Minister Umberto Tupini.

References

External links
 

1960 films
Films directed by Stefano Vanzina
Films scored by Carlo Rustichelli
Italian comedy films
1960 comedy films
1960s Italian-language films
1960s Italian films